The Computer Science Teachers Association (CSTA) is a professional association whose mission to “empower, engage and advocate for K-12 CS teachers worldwide.” It supports and encourages education in the field of computer science and related areas.  Started in 2004, CSTA supports computer science education in elementary schools, middle schools, high schools, higher education, and industry. It sponsors the Computer Science Honor Society.

Awards
Together with the Association for Computing Machinery (ACM), the CSTA offers the ACM/CSTA Cutler-Bell Prize in High School Computing. The award provides four $10,000 scholarships to each of four winners along with travel to a reception each February.

Computer Science Education Standards
CSTA publishes a set of recommended Computer Science Standards for kindergarten through high school.
CSTA the Association for Computing Machinery publish an interactive State-By-State map showing the degree to which the recommended computer science standards have been included in the state educational standards.

CSTA recommendations for computer science education include beginning introductory lessons as early as kindergarten. A recent report by Association for Computing Machinery and the CSTA, Running on Empty: The Failure to Teach K-12 Computer Science in the Digital Age, found that in the United States, most high schools count computer science as an elective and most secondary schools have few educational standards related to computer science.

Code.org Advocacy Coalition
CSTA is one of the participating organizations in the Code.org Advocacy Coalition (previously called Computing in the Core (CinC)). 
The Code.org Advocacy Coalition is a group of organizations that works on public outreach and advocacy to encourage additional support for computer science in the core curriculum and includes members such as Microsoft, Google, Facebook, Anita Borg Institute for Women and Technology, Computing Research Association, and others.

Chapters
CSTA has more than 50 chapters in the United States and international affiliates in Israel, New Zealand, and the United Kingdom.

Newsletters
CSTA publishes a monthly newsletter, the CSTA Voice, that highlights issues related to computer science education.

Governance
The 2022-23 CSTA Board of Directors consists of:

Dan Blier

Board Chair, School District Representative (Chair July 2021 - June 2023;  Term July 2019 - June 2024)

Nimmi Arunachalam 

At Large Representative, (July 2022 - June 2024)

Greg Bianchi

Partner Representative, Microsoft (July 2021 - June 2023)

Cindi Chang

State Department Representative (July 2022 - June 2024)

Charity Freeman

Board Chair-Elect, Teacher Education Representative (July 2022 - June 2026)

Michelle Friend

At-Large Representative (July 2021 - June 2023)

Abigail Joseph 

K-8 Teacher Representative (July 2022 - June 2024) 

Audra Kaplan 

K-8 Representative (July 2021 - June 2023) 

Richard Ladner

University Representative (July 2022 - June 2024)

Art Lopez

9–12 Representative (July 2021 - June 2023)

Yolanda Lozano

9-12 Teacher Representative, (July 2022 - June 2024)

Andrew McGettrick 

ACM Representative, (July 2022 - June 2024)

Michelle Page

Treasurer (July 2022- June 2024) 

CSTA Committees include:

See also

 Association for Computing Machinery
 Computer science
 Education

References

External links
 Official Website
 Official website
 Association for Computing Machinery
 Computer Science Education Week
 ACM/CSTA Cutler-Bell Prize in High School Computing

Computer science education
Computer science organizations
Computer science-related professional associations
Professional associations based in the United States